Antony Peebles is a British concert pianist. He won the 1971 BBC Piano competition and has performed in 131 different countries around the world.

Biography
Antony Peebles studied at Westminster School and Trinity College, Cambridge, from which he was awarded a MusB degree. After leaving university, Peebles studied the piano with various tutors including Peter Katin, Yvonne Lefébure and Jeremy Siepmann. He received a number of scholarships during this time.

Peebles' big break came in 1971, when he was awarded the BBC Piano Competition. He played Gaspard de la nuit by Maurice Ravel, receiving universal acclaim from the jury, including renowned pianist Vlado Perlemuter, who commented that he'd never heard the piece interpreted better. Peebles also won the French Claude Debussy competition in 1972.

Following these successes, Peebles became a regular concert pianist, both as a performer of concertos with major orchestras in the United Kingdom and, famously, by touring the world playing the piano - sometimes alone, and sometimes with violinist John Georgiadis, with whom he formed the Georgiadis/Peebles Duo. Peebles has now performed in 131 countries.
Peebles has recorded five CDs of piano music, all with Meridian Records.

Discography

References and notes

Year of birth missing (living people)
Living people
British classical pianists
Male classical pianists
21st-century classical pianists
21st-century British male musicians